Paragnetina is a genus of common stoneflies in the family Perlidae. There are at least 20 described species in Paragnetina.

Species
These 26 species belong to the genus Paragnetina.

References

Further reading

 
 
 
 
 
 
 
 

Perlidae